Prunum olivaeforme is a species of sea snail, a marine gastropod mollusk in the family Marginellidae, the margin snails.

Description
The length of the shell attains 12 mm.

Distribution
This marine species occurs off Senegal.

References

 Cossignani T. (2006). Marginellidae & Cystiscidae of the World. L'Informatore Piceno. 408pp

External links
 Kiener L.C. (1834-1841). Spécies général et iconographie des coquilles. Vol. 3. Famille des Columellaires. Genres Mitre (Mitra), Lamarck, pp. 1-120, pl. 1-34
 Hinds, R. B. (1844). Descriptions of Marginellae collected during the voyage of H. M. S. Sulphur, and from the collection of H. Cuming Esq. Proceedings of the Zoological Society of London. (1844) 12: 72-77
 Petit de la Saussaye S. (1851). Notice sur le genre Marginelle, Marginella, Lamarck, suivie d'un catalogue synonymique des espèces de ce genre. Journal de Conchyliologie. 2: 38-59
 Jousseaume F. (1875). Coquilles de la famille des marginelles. Monographie. Revue et Magazin de Zoologie. ser. 3, 3: 164-271; 429-435.

Marginellidae
Gastropods described in 1834